The dollar has been the currency of Barbados since 1935. Globally its currency has the ISO 4217 code BBD, however, unofficially in Barbados the International vehicle registration code BDS is also commonly used, a currency code that is otherwise reserved for Bangladesh (ISO 3166-1 country code BD) outside Barbados. As such the present dollar has the ISO 4217 code BBD.  The Barbadian dollar is divided into 100 cents.

History
The history of currency in the former British colony of Barbados closely follows that of British Eastern Caribbean territories in general. Even though Queen Anne's proclamation of 1704 introduced the pound sterling currency system to the West Indies, silver pieces of eight (Spanish dollars and later Mexican dollars) continued to form a major portion of the circulating currency right into the latter half of the nineteenth century.

Britain adopted the gold standard in 1821 and an imperial order-in-council of 1838 resulted in Barbados formally adopting the British sterling coinage in the year 1848. However, despite the circulation of British coins in Barbados the silver pieces of eight continued to circulate alongside them and the private sector continued to use dollar accounts for reckoning. The international silver crisis of 1873 signalled the end of the silver dollar era in the West Indies and silver dollars were demonetized in Barbados in 1879. This left a state of affairs, in which the British coinage circulated, being reckoned in dollar accounts at an automatic conversion rate of 1 dollar = 4 shillings 2 pence. The first currency denominated in dollars to be issued in Barbados was in the form of private banknotes introduced in 1882. No subdivisions of the dollar were issued and these notes circulated alongside sterling, together with 1 pound notes issued by the government in 1917. From 1920, some of the private banknotes also carried a denomination in sterling, with 1 dollar = 4 shillings 2 pence.

From 1949, with the introduction of the British West Indies dollar, the currency of Barbados became officially tied with those of the British Eastern Caribbean territories in general. Between 1938 and 1949, the Barbadian government issued paper money denominated in dollars. The last private bank issues were made in 1949. The British sterling coinage was eventually replaced by a new decimal coinage in 1955, with the new cent being equal to one half of the old penny. In 1965, the Eastern Caribbean dollar replaced the British West Indies dollar in Barbados.

The present dollar was created after the establishment of the Central Bank of Barbados (CBB), which was founded by an Act of parliament in May, 1972. The Barbados dollar replaced the East Caribbean dollar at par in 1973. Since 5 July 1975, the Barbados dollar has been pegged to the US dollar. It is presently fixed at an exchange rate of US$1 = BDS$1.98. However, some businesses accept US dollars at an exchange rate of US$1 = BDS$2.

For a wider outline of the history of currency in the region, see Currencies of the British West Indies.

Coins

From 1973 through 1991, the 1¢ was struck in bronze. From 1992, copper-plated zinc has been used. The 5¢ coin is struck in brass, whilst the highest 3 denominations are struck in cupronickel. The  coin is a 7-sided equilaterally-curved piece. A flying fish is adorned on one side, with the Barbadian coat of arms on the reverse. The Barbadian dollar coins are now minted in a plated-steel planchet first issued in 2007. Many of the coins in circulation have been struck at the Royal Canadian Mint.

The reverse of the 5 cent coin depicts the South Point Lighthouse, the oldest lighthouse in Barbados.

Banknotes

In 1882, the Colonial Bank introduced notes for 5 dollars. In 1920, 20 and 100 dollar notes were also issued by this bank. In 1922, Barclays Bank, having taken over the Colonial Bank, began issuing 5, 20 and 100 dollar notes. The higher denominations ceased production in 1940 but the 5 dollar continued to be issued until 1949.

The Royal Bank of Canada introduced notes in 1909, in denominations of 5, 20 and 100 dollars. From 1920, these notes also bore the denomination in sterling, with 5 dollars = 1 pound 10 pence, 20 dollars = 4 pounds 3 shillings 4 pence and 100 dollars = 20 pounds 16 shillings 8 pence. Notes were issued until 1938. The Canadian Bank of Commerce issued notes between 1922 and 1940, also in denominations of 5, 20 and 100 dollars.

Between 1938 and 1949, the government issued notes in denominations of 1, 2, 5, 20 and 100 dollars. All bore the portrait of King George VI.

On 3 December 1973, the Central Bank of Barbados introduced notes in denominations of 1, 5, 10, 20 and 100 dollars.  2 dollar notes were introduced in 1980, followed by 50 dollars in 1989. The 1 dollar note was no longer issued after 1988.

Banknotes currently in circulation are:
2 dollars (blue)
5 dollars (green)
10 dollars (brown)
20 dollars (purple)
50 dollars (orange)
100 dollars (grey)

The defunct 1 Dollar note was red in colour and had Samuel Jackman Prescod on the obverse.

On 2 May 2013, the Central Bank of Barbados issued a new series of banknotes with a more modern design. The portraits on all of the denominations have been retained, but on the back of the notes is a design specific to the person depicted on the front of the notes.

On the 21 March 2022, the Central Bank of Barbados announced its intent to replace the current paper banknotes with polymer banknotes by the end of the year stating it would allow for more secure and durable cash. The new designs of the polymer banknotes were then later revealed on 4 May 2022 and the notes were rolled out on 5 December 2022.

See also

List of people on banknotes#Barbados
Currencies of the British West Indies
Central banks and currencies of the Caribbean
Economy of Barbados

Notes

References

Further reading

External links
www.giervalk.bravepages.com Images of Barbadian banknotes 
Coins of Barbados, online catalog
 The banknotes of Barbados

Currencies of Barbados
Fixed exchange rate
Currencies introduced in 1935
Currencies introduced in 1973
Currencies of the British Empire
Currencies of the Commonwealth of Nations